The Ebo Wildlife Reserve is protected area and proposed national park in Cameroon that covers  of lowland and montane forest mosaic with a high proportion of disturbed forest. The critically endangered Preuss's red colobus has been recorded within the confines of the proposed park.

It is situated just 20 km north of the Sanaga River, a biogeographically important barrier to species dispersal. The Ebo Forest Research Station was established in April 2005, and preliminary biological inventories suggest the Ebo Forest
has comparable biodiversity to other centres of endemism in the Cameroon-Nigeria highlands region.

Some of Ebo Forest's unique residents are : Nigeria-Cameroon Chimpanzee, Western Gorilla, Goliath Frog, Forest Elephant, Preuss’s Red Colobus Monkey, Drill, Grey-necked Rockfowl, Grey Parrot.

This forest is of great importance for 40 communities of the local population - Banen people, who rely on it for food, medicine and cultural activities.

References

Protected areas of Cameroon